Salt Lake Municipal Airport may refer to:
Salt Lake City Municipal 2 Airport in West Jordan
The former name of Salt Lake City International Airport